Jörgen Persson is a Swedish former footballer. who played for Malmö FF in 1993.

References

Living people
Swedish footballers
Allsvenskan players
Malmö FF players
Association footballers not categorized by position
Year of birth missing (living people)